Legend is a 2014 Indian Telugu-language action masala film written and directed by Boyapati Srinu. The film stars Nandamuri Balakrishna in a dual role alongside Jagapathi Babu, Sonal Chauhan and Radhika Apte. It was produced by 14 Reels Entertainment and Varahi Chalana Chitram. The film has music composed by Devi Sri Prasad. 

Legend was released on 28 March 2014 worldwide. 

Upon release, the film received mixed reviews from critics and went on to become the fourth-highest grossing film of 2014 in Telugu. The film received praise for the performances of Balakrishna and Babu in addition to the music, dialogues and direction.

Plot 
1989: Jeetendra a cruel faction leader Kurnool visits at Vizag in 1989 when to fix up his alliance with local MLA’s daughter. During their return, he drives into an accident and also fires for all to fear. In that region, a family shares the hardships of the public. Despite the arbitrator’s mother's hindrance to being out of violence. The arbitrator just deserts Jeetendra to apologize when he talks smack. Therein, he affronts slaps Jeetendra and apprehends him when the antagonism undertakes. So, to acquit Jeetendra his father abducts the arbitrator’s wife & son. 

Soon after release, shockingly Jeetendra sights his father dead. Forthwith, he is aware that his father is eliminated by the boy as he has slain his mother. The incident severe impact on the arbitrator’s mother who asks him to stop still. But he replies it commenced and the answer is his son, the legend. Parallelly, Jeetendra’s enmity becomes permanent and he settles in Vizag to clutch the authority. Plus, he kills the arbitrator when a frightened old lady sends her grandson far away.  Next, a sidekick MP divulges about Jaidev to Jeetendra’s youngest and spins rearward.  

2014: Krishna is a valor at Dubai who is unable to tolerate any sort of injustice and knocks the lawbreakers. He proceeds to India with his fiancée Sneha for his espousal against his grandmother’s interest. On the way, he views Jeetendra’s elder one Chotu assassinating a former MLA Simhachalam to wind up a pending case and mold his father as Chief Minister. Krishna thrashes him, the episode is witnessed by Sneha’s father, a local DC. Later, while he is meeting Krishna, DC alerts him stating the brutality of Jeetendra. A day after, Chotu who is admitted to the hospital dies mysteriously. Whereat, Jeetendra infuriates to seek avenge and severe hunt of homicide. 

Since CCTV footage is missing at two sites Jeetendra declares the person is analogous. Overhearing it, DC cancels the match and bars, Sneha. Although, she skips and catches by Jeetendra via whom he finds the whereabouts of Krishna. Simultaneously, Krishna is advancing to his wedding venue with his conjoined extended family and they are assaulted by barbaric. At a temple, Jeetendra shoots Krishna who collapses, as well as, he orders his second son to slaughter the whole family and quit. Here as a flabbergast, lands Jaidev the Legend, elder brother of Krishna who onslaughts on blackguards and shields his men. Following this, Jaidev uproars against Jeetendra proclaims he is the one that butchered Chotu, and also warns him never to try to look back.

1999: After a couple of years attaining control over the city Jeetendra ploys, intrudes his younger sibling into the politics, and triumphs by rubbing out the opposition who suffers public. Jaidev, the prevailing umpire of the terrain, impedes their enormities and gets Jeetendra seized. Hence, he is esteemed as a deity by all except his grandmother who has ostracized him as he has chosen the path of the fierceness and they share the same compound. Anyhow, Jaidev always shades his family. He screens his sister from getting aborted for continuously conceiving baby girls by glorifying the eminence of women. In the interim, Radhika his cousin the only one that endears him from childhood, comforts him, and they adore each other. 

As of today, Union minister Ameer Shah arrives from Delhi and challenges Jaidev to free Jeetendra and sculpt him as CM. However, Jaidev reprisals at no time.  Then, Jeetendra’s brother abducts Krishna and Jaidev guards him by knocking out him. Moreover, He bails out Jeetendra drops his try to kill on plead of his wife and gives an ultimatum to get rid of his city. Meanwhile, Radhika affirms to knit Jaidev when she too is expelled from home. On the eve of their nuptial, Jeetendra captures Radhika who dies in that combat. Accordingly, the old lady accuses Jaidev of the awful which makes him die of regret and exit.

Present: Krishna recoups at the hospital where Jaidev’s grandmother apologizes and reunites him accepting her mistake. Besides, Jeetendra conspires to snatch the CM seat by horse-trading MLAs whom Jaidev shifts to a secret place and converts as rectitudes. At that point, Jeetendra raids over and tried to assassinate the MLAs. At last, Jaidev ceases Jeetendra. Finally, the movie ends on a happy note with the Legend continuing his legacy.

Cast

Music 

Music was composed by Devi Sri Prasad. Lyrics were written by Ramajogayya Sastry. Music was released on Lahari Music company. The music director Devi Sri Prasad, teaming up with Boyapati Srinu for the third time after Bhadra and Tulasi, and scoring for the first time for a Balakrishna film There are six tracks in the album. Audio was bought by Lahari Music. The music was launched on 6 March 2014 at Shilpakala Vedika in Hyderabad with the film's theatrical trailer.

Production

Casting
Bollywood actress Sonal Chauhan was roped as one of the leading actress. Jagapathi Babu was cast as the antagonist in the film. Kalyani paired up with Jagapathi Babu as his wife. Anil Sunkara confirmed that Radhika Apte was the heroine. Hamsa Nandini appeared in a special song with Balakrishna.

Filming
The muhurtham ceremony of the film was held on 3 June 2013 in Hyderabad. The film was supposed to start its shoot in Dubai, but the production team decided to start off because Some permissions did not come through in time. The regular shooting of the film started in Ramoji Film City on 13 July 2013 at Hyderabad. The introduction scene of the hero was shot under the action choreography of Ram Laxman. A special car chase sequence of the film was shot in the deserts of Dubai and a song was canned on Balakrishna and Sonal Chauhan in this schedule.

Release
Legend was released worldwide on 28 March 2014 and was shown in 700 theaters across the state and over 1200 theaters worldwide.

Box office
Legend ran for 100 days in 31 centres and 175 days in 2 centres. The film completed 200 days run in two centres (Yemmiganur -Direct  (Kurnool district), Proddutur(Kadapa District) -Single Shift). The film also completed 275 days run in 2 centers: Yemmiganur -Direct (Kurnool district), Proddutur (Kadapa District – Single Shift). After Muddula Mavayya, Samarasimha Reddy, Narasimha Naidu and Simha 5th film to complete double century.

The film completed 365 days run in two theatres in Kurnool district with direct four shows and it also completed 1000 days in Proddutur (56 days in Arveti theatre and 944 days (single shift 4 shows) at Archana theatre).

Accolades

References

External links 
 

2014 films
2010s Telugu-language films
Films scored by Devi Sri Prasad
2014 masala films
Indian films about revenge
Films directed by Boyapati Srinu
Indian action drama films
2014 action drama films
Films set in Dubai
Films shot in Oman
Films shot in Dubai
Films shot in the United Arab Emirates
Vaaraahi Chalana Chitram films